Omox biporos, the omox blenny, is a species of combtooth blenny found in the western Pacific ocean.  This species reaches a length of  SL.

References

biporos
Fish described in 1972
Fish of the Pacific Ocean
Taxa named by Victor G. Springer